Julio Nilo Juaneda (born 1912, date of death unknown) is an Argentine weightlifter who competed in the 1932 Summer Olympics. He finished sixth in the middleweight class. He was born in Buenos Aires.

External links
Julio Juaneda's profile at Sports Reference.com

1912 births
Year of death missing
Argentine male weightlifters
Olympic weightlifters of Argentina
Weightlifters at the 1932 Summer Olympics
20th-century Argentine people